During the 1978–79 season, Red Star Belgrade participated in the 1978–79 Yugoslav First League, 1978–79 Yugoslav Cup and 1978–79 UEFA Cup.

Season summary
Red Star lost to Borussia Mönchengladbach in the 1979 UEFA Cup Final. Zoran Filipović missed the majority of the season due to his mandatory military service.

Squad

Results

Yugoslav First League

Yugoslav Cup

UEFA Cup

First round

Second round

Third round

Quarter-finals

Semi-finals

Final

See also
 List of Red Star Belgrade seasons

References

Red Star Belgrade seasons
Red Star
Red Star